Methodius (1771–1850) was Greek Orthodox Patriarch of Antioch (May 25, 1823 – July 6, 1850). Little is known of Patriarch Methodius' life. In May 1848, Methodius was a signatory, with the patriarchs of Constantinople, Alexandria, and Jerusalem, of an encyclical to the Church responding to the "Epistle to the Easterns" by Pope Pius IX. The encyclical denounced the Filioque added by Rome to the Nicene-Constantinopolitan Creed as a heresy, censured the papacy for missionizing among Orthodox Christians, and repudiated Ultramontanism (papal supremacy).

Literature

References

External links
 Primates of the Apostolic See of Antioch

1771 births
1850 deaths
Greek Orthodox Patriarchs of Antioch